Gerald Martin Smith (born 21 May 1955) is a British businessman and convicted fraudster.

Early life
Gerald Smith was born on 21 May 1955. He qualified as a physician.

Business career
In 1993, while chief executive of the Farr construction group, he was prosecuted for stealing £2m from its pension fund and sentenced to two years' imprisonment.

In 2002, Smith acquired 30% of Izodia plc through his investment company, Orb. He placed his own directors on the board and moved the main company bank account to Jersey where he stole money from it. In December 2002, the Serious Fraud Office (SFO) raided his home in Jersey and his company offices. By February 2005, criminal charges were being considered. On the day that Smith was to report with his lawyers to the SFO's offices, he was involved in a car crash and had to be cut from his Audi A8 after having run into a tree. Traffic police found two first class tickets to New York in his briefcase. In 2005, he pled guilty to 10 counts of theft totalling £34m and one of false accounting in respect of his position at Izodia plc. He was sentenced to eight years' imprisonment and, in 2006, disqualified from acting as a company director for 15 years. He was released from jail after four years.

In 2003, he sued Andy Ruhan, his former business associate, for over £100 million he claimed was owed to him in respect of a hotel deal.

Personal life
Smith was married to Gail Cochrane, a medical practitioner in Jersey, until their divorce. The couple have two daughters. She was described by Serious Fraud Office lawyer Kennedy Talbot QC as the "front" for Smith's continuing business activities.

References 

 
 
 

1955 births
British people convicted of fraud
20th-century British medical doctors
Living people
Jersey criminals